Vitapi Punyu Ngaruka (born 16 October 1995) is a Namibian footballer who plays as a defender for Black Africa and the Namibia national football team.

Career statistics

International

International goals
As of 4 August 2020. Namibia score listed first, score column indicates score after each Ngaruka goal.

References

1995 births
Living people
Namibian men's footballers
Namibia international footballers
Association football defenders
United Stars F.C. players
Black Africa S.C. players
People from Omaheke Region
Namibia A' international footballers
2018 African Nations Championship players
2020 African Nations Championship players